Yengarie is a rural locality in the Fraser Coast Region, Queensland, Australia.

Heritage listings
Yengarie has a number of heritage-listed sites, including:
 Old Mill Road: Central Sugar Mill Ruins
 Old Mill Road: Yengarie Sugar Refinery Ruins

See also
 List of tramways in Queensland

References

External links

 

 
Localities in Queensland
Fraser Coast Region